Jeffrey Finis Barry (born September 22, 1969) is a former Major League Baseball outfielder. He is an alumnus of San Diego State University.

Drafted by the Montreal Expos in the 4th round of the 1990 Major League Baseball Draft, Barry made his Major League Baseball debut with the New York Mets on June 9, 1995, and appear in his final game on October 3, 1999. In 2000, Barry played in Japan for the Chiba Lotte Marines.

External links

1969 births
Living people
Colorado Rockies players
Major League Baseball outfielders
Baseball players from Oregon
New York Mets players
Binghamton Mets players
St. Lucie Mets players
Jamestown Expos players
West Palm Beach Expos players
Norfolk Tides players
Gulf Coast Mets players
Las Vegas Stars (baseball) players
Memphis Chicks players
Colorado Springs Sky Sox players
Charlotte Knights players
Las Vegas 51s players
New Haven Ravens players
Sportspeople from Medford, Oregon
Major League Baseball center fielders
American expatriate baseball players in Japan
Chiba Lotte Marines players
Anchorage Glacier Pilots players